The 2015 Wichita Falls Nighthawks season was the team's first season as a professional indoor football franchise as an expansion team of the Indoor Football League (IFL). One of ten teams competing in the IFL for the 2015 season, the Wichita Falls, Texas-based Nighthawks are members of the Intense Conference.

Schedule
Key:

Regular season
All start times are local time

Roster

Standings

References

External links
Wichita Falls Nighthawks official website

Wichita Falls Nighthawks
Wichita Falls Nighthawks
Wichita Falls Nighthawks